Besse may refer to:

Places
 Besse, Cantal, France
 Besse, Dordogne, France
 Besse, Isère, France
 Besse-et-Saint-Anastaise, Puy-de-Dôme, France
 Super-Besse, a ski resort
 Besse-sur-Issole, Var, France
 Bessé, Charente, France
 Bèssè, Benin
Besse, in Koko/Besse Local Government Area, Kebbi State, Nigeria

People
 Bernard of Besse (13th century) French Friar Minor and chronicler
 Besse Cooper (1896–2012), American suffragette and supercentenarian
 Besse Day (1889–1986), American statistician
Bessé´, fossilised woman (~70,000 years old) at Sulawesi, Indonesia
 Georges Besse (1927–1986), French businessman
 Joseph Besse (1683—1757), English writer, author of Quaker Sufferings

See also
 Bess (disambiguation)
 Bess (name)
 Bese (disambiguation)
 Bessey (surname)
 Bisse (surname)